The River Trent is a river of the English Midlands, in the United Kingdom.

Other rivers of the same name include:
 Trent River (Ontario) in Ontario, Canada
 a hamlet Trent River in the municipality of Trent Hills along Trent River (Ontario) in Ontario, Canada.
 Trent River (North Carolina) in North Carolina, United States
 Trent River (New Zealand) in New Zealand
 Trent River (Vancouver Island) on the eastern side of Vancouver Island, British Columbia, Canada
 River Piddle, in Dorset, England, sometimes archaically referred to as the Trent

fr:Rivière Trent
no:Trent